Westend Gate, formerly known as Plaza Büro Center, is a 47-storey,  skyscraper in the Westend-Süd district of Frankfurt, Germany. It was the tallest building in Germany from 1976 until 1978 when it was surpassed by the Silberturm, which is also located in Frankfurt.

The Westend Gate is located just across the street from the Frankfurt Trade Fair grounds and near the Naturmuseum Senckenberg and the Bockenheim Campus of the Goethe University Frankfurt.

The structure consists of 2 slabs plus a narrow wing attached to the east side. It was renamed Westend Gate in 2011, when it was completely renovated as a green building.

The lower half of the tower contains offices, while floors 26–44 are a hotel, originally the CP Frankfurt Plaza Hotel, known since 1989 as the Frankfurt Marriott.

See also 
 List of tallest buildings in Frankfurt
 List of tallest buildings in Germany
 List of tallest buildings in the European Union
 List of tallest buildings in Europe

References 

Office buildings completed in 1976
Skyscrapers in Frankfurt
1976 establishments in West Germany
Skyscraper office buildings in Germany
Skyscraper hotels in Germany